Leptocoris is the largest genus of the soapberry bug subfamily. The 41 species of this genus are distributed throughout Africa, South Asia, and Oceania and are thought to have originated in Africa, where the greatest diversity of Leptocoris species are found.  Members of this genus are large-bodied and have short, wide pronota; they are similar in appearance to the New World genus Jadera (of which there is no range overlap). Leptocoris species can be easily distinguished from the small, slender Boisea (of which there is substantial range overlap).  The Australian Leptocoris tagalicus has been studied for its ability to rapidly adapt to invasive hosts (e.g. balloon vine) and is seen as a possible means of biocontrol for environmental weeds.  The southeast Asian species Leptocoris vicinus is common in urban settings, although it is frequently misidentified as Leptocoris augur.

Species 

Leptocoris abdominalis
Leptocoris aethiops
Leptocoris affinis
Leptocoris albisoleatus
Leptocoris amictus
Leptocoris augur
Leptocoris bahram
Leptocoris capitis
Leptocoris chevreuxi
Leptocoris cinnamomensis
Leptocoris corniculatus
Leptocoris coxalis
Leptocoris dispar
Leptocoris fuscus
Leptocoris griseiventris
Leptocoris hexophthalmus
Leptocoris insularis
Leptocoris intermedia
Leptocoris isolatus
Leptocoris lanuginosa
Leptocoris lata
Leptocoris longiusculus
Leptocoris marquesensis
Leptocoris minusculus
Leptocoris mitellatus
Leptocoris mutilatus
Leptocoris nigrofasciatus
Leptocoris obscura
Leptocoris paramictus
Leptocoris pectoralis
Leptocoris productus
Leptocoris rufomarginatus
Leptocoris seidenstueckeri
Leptocoris stehliki
Leptocoris subrufescens
Leptocoris tagalicus
Leptocoris teyrovskyi
Leptocoris toricollis
Leptocoris ursulae
Leptocoris verticalis
Leptocoris vicinus
Leptocoris wagneri

References 

Serinethinae
Taxa named by Carl Wilhelm Hahn
Pentatomomorpha genera